Bone Cage is a 2020 Canadian drama film written and directed by Taylor Olson. Adapted from play of the same name by Catherine Banks, the film stars Olson as Jamie, a forestry worker whose ethical conflicts about participating in clearcutting, but having no options to leave the job, are beginning to affect his personal relationships, and Amy Groening as Chicky, his sister who has placed her own dreams of leaving town in search of something better on hold to stay and care for their ailing father Clarence (Christian Murray).

The film's cast also includes Ursula Calder as Jamie's fiancée Krista, Sam Vigneault as Jamie's best friend and Krista's brother Kevin, and David Rossetti as Chicky's married lover Reg, as well as Stephanie MacDonald, Reid Price, Sebastien Labelle, Ann-Marie Kerr, Bob Mann, Monte Murray, Jacob Sampson and Thom Payne.

The film premiered on September 17, 2020, at the FIN Atlantic Film Festival, where it won the awards for Best Atlantic Feature, Best Atlantic Director, Best Atlantic Screenplay and Best Atlantic Cinematography.

The film received two Canadian Screen Award nominations at the 9th Canadian Screen Awards in 2021, for Best Supporting Actress (Groening) and Best Adapted Screenplay (Olson).

References

External links

2020 films
2020 drama films
2020s English-language films
Canadian drama films
English-language Canadian films
Films based on Canadian plays
Films shot in Nova Scotia
2020s Canadian films